Jennifer A. Riley Collins is an American attorney and politician.

Riley Collins is from Meridian, Mississippi. She graduated from Meridian High School and earned her bachelor's degree from Alcorn State University in 1987. She earned a master's degree in criminal justice administration in 1993 from University of Central Texas and a Juris Doctor in 1999 from the Mississippi College School of Law.

Riley Collins enlisted in the United States Army in 1985, and served as an intelligence officer on active duty for 14 years. She spent another 18 years in the United States National Guard and United States Army Reserve. She retired at the rank of colonel in 2017. She also served as the executive director of the Mississippi chapter of the American Civil Liberties Union from 2013 to 2019. In the 2019 election, she ran for Attorney General of Mississippi. She lost to Lynn Fitch, the Mississippi State Treasurer, which ended the Democratic Party's streak of holding the office since 1878.

In February 2020, Riley Collins became the county administrator for Hinds County.

References

External links

Living people
People from Meridian, Mississippi
United States Army officers
Alcorn State University alumni
Mississippi College School of Law alumni
Mississippi Democrats
1965 births